Stamford is a village in Harlan County, Nebraska, United States. The population was 183 at the 2010 census.

History
Stamford was laid out in 1887 when the Chicago, Burlington and Quincy Railroad was extended to that point. It was likely named after Stamford, Connecticut which in turn was named after Stamford, Lincolnshire, England. Stamford was incorporated as a village in 1907.

Geography
Stamford is located at  (40.132554, -99.593368).

Demographics

2010 census
As of the census of 2010, there were 183 people, 82 households, and 48 families living in the village. The racial makeup of the village was 97.3% White, 1.6% from other races, and 1.1% from two or more races. Hispanic or Latino of any race were 3.8% of the population.

There were 82 households, of which 25.6% had children under the age of 18 living with them, 48.8% were married couples living together, 6.1% had a female householder with no husband present, 3.7% had a male householder with no wife present, and 41.5% were non-families. 41.5% of all households were made up of individuals, and 20.7% had someone living alone who was 65 years of age or older. The average household size was 2.23 and the average family size was 3.04.

The median age in the village was 45.5 years. 25.7% of residents were under the age of 18; 5.5% were between the ages of 18 and 24; 18.5% were from 25 to 44; 23.5% were from 45 to 64; and 26.8% were 65 years of age or older. The gender makeup of the village was 47.5% male and 52.5% female.

2000 census
As of the census of 2000, there were 202 people, 90 households, and 57 families living in the village. The population density was 426.0 people per square mile (165.9/km). There were 102 housing units at an average density of 215.1 per square mile (83.8/km). The racial makeup of the village was 97.03% White, 0.50% from other races, and 2.48% from two or more races. Hispanic or Latino of any race were 3.47% of the population.

There were 90 households, out of which 23.3% had children under the age of 18 living with them, 53.3% were married couples living together, 4.4% had a female householder with no husband present, and 35.6% were non-families. 34.4% of all households were made up of individuals, and 18.9% had someone living alone who was 65 years of age or older. The average household size was 2.24 and the average family size was 2.84.

In the village, the population was spread out, with 21.3% under the age of 18, 6.9% from 18 to 24, 22.3% from 25 to 44, 22.3% from 45 to 64, and 27.2% who were 65 years of age or older. The median age was 44 years. For every 100 females, there were 94.2 males. For every 100 females age 18 and over, there were 93.9 males.

As of 2000 the median income for a household in the village was $31,667, and the median income for a family was $42,250. Males had a median income of $25,625 versus $16,250 for females. The per capita income for the village was $14,076. About 8.2% of families and 7.3% of the population were below the poverty line, including 1.9% of those under the age of eighteen and 8.3% of those 65 or over.

References

Villages in Harlan County, Nebraska
Villages in Nebraska
Populated places established in 1887